Johnston Township is one of the twenty-four townships of Trumbull County, Ohio, United States.  The 2000 census found 2,040 people in the township.

Geography
Located in the northeastern part of the county, it borders the following townships:
Gustavus Township - north
Kinsman Township - northeast corner
Vernon Township - east
Hartford Township - southeast corner
Fowler Township - south
Bazetta Township - southwest corner
Mecca Township - west
Greene Township - northwest corner

Part of the city of Cortland is located in southwestern Johnston Township.

Name and history
Johnston Township was established in 1816, and named after Captain James Johnston, a Connecticut land agent. It is the only Johnston Township statewide, although there is a Johnson Township in Champaign County.

Government
The township is governed by a three-member board of trustees, who are elected in November of odd-numbered years to a four-year term beginning on the following January 1. Two are elected in the year after the presidential election and one is elected in the year before it. There is also an elected township fiscal officer, who serves a four-year term beginning on April 1 of the year after the election, which is held in November of the year before the presidential election. Vacancies in the fiscal officership or on the board of trustees are filled by the remaining trustees.

Board of Trustees
Davis W Denman - Chairman

Dominic Marchese - Chairman

James N. Carnes - Trustee

John T. Moran - Fiscal Officer

Notable people
William J. Austin, miller, farmer, and Wisconsin state legislator, was born in the township.

References

External links
Township website
County website

Townships in Trumbull County, Ohio
1816 establishments in Ohio
Populated places established in 1816
Townships in Ohio